Truant / Rough Sleeper is the sixth extended play by British electronic music producer Burial. It was digitally released by Hyperdub on 14 December 2012, with a vinyl and CD release following on 17 December 2012.

Track listing
All tracks written and produced by Burial.

Charts

References

External links
 
 

2012 EPs
Dystopian music
Hyperdub EPs
Burial (musician) EPs